The 2013 Metro Atlantic Athletic Conference men's soccer season will be the 21st season of men's varsity soccer in the conference.

The defending regular season champions, the Loyola Greyhounds, left the MAAC for the Patriot League. The defending tournament champions are the Niagara Purple Eagles.

Changes from 2012 

 Quinnipiac and Monmouth are joining the MAAC from the Northeast Conference.
 Loyola is leaving the conference to join the Patriot League.

Teams

Stadia and locations

MAAC Tournament

Results

References 

 
2013 NCAA Division I men's soccer season